Water Polo Australia (WPA), formerly Australian Water Polo (AWP), is the national governing body for Water polo in Australia. They are responsible for administration of the national men's, women's, and junior teams, the Australian National Water Polo League, and development of the sport in Australia.
 
WPA broke away from the Amateur Swimming Union of Australia (now Swimming Australia) in 1982 to become the Australian Amateur Water Polo Association (AAWPA). Prior to that time, water polo was administered by a sub-committee of the ASUA.

In January, 1990, the AAWPA changed its name to 'Water Polo Australia Incorporated'. The sport is now governed by a national conference of representatives from all states and territories, which elect five Directors to the WPAL Board. Water polo is one of a small number of truly national sports in Australia, with the game being played by both men and women across every state.

WPA also ensures the senior men's and women's teams tour overseas at least once a year, and in addition holds national men's and women's competitions for 20 & Unders, 18 & Unders, 16 & Unders, and 14 & Unders.

State Associations 
WPA also oversees all of the state governing bodies for each of the Australian states. These are: Water Polo ACT,  Water Polo New South Wales, Water Polo Queensland, Water Polo Tasmania, Water Polo South Australia, Water Polo Victoria, and Water Polo Western Australia.

History 
Behind Great Britain, Australia was the second nation in the world to play the game of water polo. The first known Australian match occurred at St. Kilda Baths, Melbourne on 3 March 1879 and was demonstrated by Professor Fred Cavill, who had only just emigrated from England. Australian men's teams have competed at every Olympic Games Water Polo Tournament since 1948, excepting 1968 (controversially not nominated by the AOC) and 1996 (did not qualify). Australia were the inaugural Olympic gold medallists at the first Women's Olympic Games Water Polo Tournament in Sydney (2000), and have since won two Olympic bronze medals at Beijing (2008) and London (2012).

See also
 Australia men's national water polo team
 Australia women's national water polo team
 Australian National Water Polo League
 Water Polo Australia Hall of Fame

References

External links 
Water Polo Australia

Water polo in Australia
Australia
Wat
1982 establishments in Australia
Sports organizations established in 1982